Quadrus cerialis, the common blue-skipper or peppered blue skipper, is a butterfly of the family Hesperiidae. It is found from Panama to Bolivia. The habitat consists of rainforests, cloud forests and humid deciduous forests at altitudes up to 1,400 metres.

References

Butterflies described in 1782
Pyrginae
Taxa named by Caspar Stoll